Aadamkhor is a 1986 Bollywood Hindi language horror movie directed by Joginder Shelly. The film stars Joginder Shelly, Neelam Mehra, Nazneen, Sona Mastan Mirza, Jagdarshan, Randhawa and Reetu Khanna.

Plot 
The leading protagonists are the daughters of four army officers who practise different faiths: Hindu, Muslim, Christian and Sikh. They are trained in martial arts with the intent to promote secularism within the country.

Cast 
 Neelam Mehra
 Iqbal Durrani
 Pinchoo Kapoor
 Nazneen
 Sona Mastan Mirza
 Joginder Shelly
 Sunil Dhawan
 Ranjeet
 Sadhana Khote
 Ved Goswami
 Jogdarshan
 Jaggu
 Uma Khosla
 Kundan

Soundtrack
"Badla Har Ek Taur Hai" – Mahendra Kapoor
"De Khna Tab Mazaa Aayega" – Deepa Dey
"Paida Kiya Hai Bharat Ma Ne" – Mahendra Kapoor
"Tere Samne Hai Ladki Jawan" – Deepa Dey, Dilraj Kaur, Meenu Purushottam
"Tune Jo Chua Hoton Se" – Deepa Dey

References

External links 
 

1986 films
1980s Hindi-language films
Films scored by Sonik-Omi